Evadne is a genus of onychopods in the family Podonidae. There are at least four described species in Evadne.

Species
 Evadne anonyx Sars 1897
 Evadne nordmanni Lovén, 1836
 Evadne prolongata Behning 1938
 Evadne spinifera P. E. Müller, 1867

References

Further reading

 
 
 
 

Cladocera